Douglas Armstead Shively (born March 18, 1937) is a former American football player and coach. He was the head coach for the Arizona Wranglers of the United States Football League (USFL) in 1983, compiling an overall record of four wins and 14 losses. Shively also served as an assistant coach in the National Football League (NFL) for 19 seasons, most notably as the defensive coordinator of the Tampa Bay Buccaneers in 1985 and as the assistant head coach for defense of the Atlanta Falcons from 1990 to 1993.

Early life
Shively was born and raised in Lexington, Kentucky, where his father, Bernie Shively, was the athletic director at the University of Kentucky from 1938 until his death in 1967. After graduating from high school, Shively enrolled at Kentucky, following in his father's footsteps, who had earned All-America honors as a member of the Fighting Illini football team in 1926. He lettered in football for three years (1956–1958) as well as in baseball.

Head coaching record

References

1937 births
Living people
American football ends
Atlanta Falcons coaches
Clemson Tigers football coaches
High school football coaches in Texas
Houston Oilers coaches
Kentucky Wildcats football coaches
Kentucky Wildcats football players
National Football League defensive coordinators
New Orleans Saints coaches
North Carolina Tar Heels football coaches
Sportspeople from Lexington, Kentucky
Players of American football from Lexington, Kentucky
San Diego Chargers coaches
Tampa Bay Buccaneers coaches
United States Football League coaches
Virginia Tech Hokies football coaches